Wang Xueer (born 15 January 1998) is a Chinese competitive swimmer who specializes in backstroke.

She qualified for the 2016 Summer Olympics in Rio de Janeiro in the 100 meter backstroke. She swam the 14th time in the heats and reached the semifinals where she finished 16th.

References

1998 births
Living people
Chinese female backstroke swimmers
Olympic swimmers of China
Swimmers at the 2016 Summer Olympics
Asian Games medalists in swimming
Swimmers at the 2014 Asian Games

Asian Games bronze medalists for China
Medalists at the 2014 Asian Games
21st-century Chinese women